The following is a list of cast members who voiced or portrayed characters appearing in the Batman films. The list is sorted by film and character, as some characters may have been portrayed by multiple actors.

Actors Lewis Wilson and Robert Lowery first appeared as the character in the serial films, Batman (1943) and Batman and Robin (1949).  While Adam West reprised his role as Batman from the 1960s television series in Batman: The Movie (1966).

In the Burton / Schumacher films, this iteration of the character is first portrayed by Michael Keaton in Batman (1989), Batman Returns (1992) and later would reprise the role in the upcoming DC Extended Universe films The Flash and Batgirl (both 2022).  Actor Val Kilmer would later replace Keaton in the role in Batman Forever (1995) and would also be replaced by George Clooney in Batman & Robin (1997).  The series was later cancelled due to the lukewarm reception to Batman & Robin. 

Actor, Kevin Conroy voices the character in multiple theatrical and Direct-to-DVD films as multiple iterations of the character.  This started with reprising his role from the DC Animated Universe in Batman: Mask of the Phantasm (1993), Batman & Mr. Freeze: SubZero (1998), Batman Beyond: Return of the Joker (2000), Batman: Mystery of the Batwoman (2003) and Batman and Harley Quinn (2017).  Conroy would later voice the character in multiple films in the DC Universe Animated Original Movies. 

In Christopher Nolan's The Dark Knight trilogy, this iteration of the character is portrayed by Christian Bale in Batman Begins (2005), The Dark Knight (2008) and The Dark Knight Rises (2012).  In 2016, a new iteration of the character was introduced in the DC Extended Universe portrayed by Ben Affleck.  In the films Batman v Superman: Dawn of Justice, Suicide Squad (both 2016), Justice League (2017) as well as filming additional scenes in the film's director's cut (2021) and in the upcoming film The Flash (2022).

Will Arnett voices the character in The Lego Movie franchise as well as a spin-off The Lego Batman Movie (2017).  In Joker (2019), Dante Pereira-Olson portrays a younger version of Bruce Wayne in a minor role. Robert Pattinson portrays a younger iteration of the character in Matt Reeves' film The Batman (2022), which is intended to launch a Batman shared universe, with two sequels planned and two spin-off television series in development for HBO Max.

Other prominent cast members who appear in the films and/or series within the franchise include Burgess Meredith, Jack Nicholson, Danny DeVito, Michelle Pfeiffer, Christopher Walken, Tommy Lee Jones, Jim Carrey, Nicole Kidman, Arnold Schwarzenegger, Uma Thurman, Mark Hamill, Michael Caine, Gary Oldman, Morgan Freeman, Liam Neeson, Heath Ledger, Tom Hardy, Anne Hathaway, Henry Cavill, Amy Adams, Gal Gadot, J. K. Simmons, Joaquin Phoenix, Zoë Kravitz, Paul Dano, Jeffrey Wright, Andy Serkis and Colin Farrell.

Feature-length live-action films

Early films

Burton / Schumacher films (1989–1997)

The Dark Knight trilogy (2005–2012)

DC Extended Universe (2016–present)

Feature-length animated films

DC Animated Universe (1993–2019)

Direct-to-DVD films (2005–present)

DC Universe Animated Original Movies (2008–present)

Featuring Batman

DC Animated Movie Universe (2013–2020)

Lego

See also 
 Batman franchise media
 Birds of Prey

Notes

References

External links 

Cast Members
Lists of actors by film series
Films Cast Members